Nekhayka is a rural locality (a village) in Dobryansky District, Perm Krai, Russia. The population was 3 as of 2010.

Geography 
Nekhayka is located 64 km northeast of Dobryanka (the district's administrative centre) by road. Nikulino is the nearest rural locality.

References 

Rural localities in Dobryansky District